Baron Teignmouth, of Teignmouth, was a title in the Peerage of Ireland. It was created in 1798 for Sir John Shore, 1st Baronet, previously Governor-General of India. He had already been created a Baronet, of Heathcote, in the County of Derby, in the Baronetage of Great Britain in 1792. The titles became extinct in 1981 on the death of the seventh Baron.

Shore baronets, of Heathcote (1792)
Sir John Shore, 1st. Baronet (1751–1834) (created Baron Teignmouth in 1798)

Barons Teignmouth (1798)
John Shore, 1st Baron Teignmouth (1751–1834)
Charles John Shore, 2nd Baron Teignmouth (1796–1885)
Charles John Shore, 3rd Baron Teignmouth (1840–1915)
Frederick Shore, 4th Baron Teignmouth (1844–1916)
Henry Shore, 5th Baron Teignmouth (1847–1926)
Hugh Aglionby Shore, 6th Baron Teignmouth (1881–1964)
Frederick Shore, 7th Baron Teignmouth (1920–1981)

References
Notes

Sources

Extinct baronies in the Peerage of Ireland
Noble titles created in 1798